The Darfur genocide is the systematic killing of ethnic Darfuri people which has occurred during the ongoing conflict in Western Sudan. It has become known as the first genocide of the 21st century. The genocide, which is being carried out against the Fur, Masalit and Zaghawa ethnic groups, has led the International Criminal Court (ICC) to indict several people for crimes against humanity, rape, forced transfer and torture. According to Eric Reeves, more than one million children have been "killed, raped, wounded, displaced, traumatized, or endured the loss of parents and families".

Origins
The crisis and ongoing conflict in Sudan's western Darfur region have developed from several separate events. The first was a civil war that occurred between the Khartoum national governments and two rebel groups in Darfur: the Justice and Equality Movement and the Sudan Liberation Movement/Army. The rebel groups were initially formed in February 2003 due to Darfur's "political and economic marginalization by Khartoum". In April 2003, when the rebel groups attacked the military airfield and kidnapped an air force general, the government launched a counterattack. It led to a response from the Khartoum government where they armed militia forces to eliminate the rebellion. This resulted in mass violence against the citizens in Darfur.

A second factor is a civil war that has occurred between the Christians, the animist Black southerners, and the Arab-dominated government since Sudan's independence from the United Kingdom in 1956. The violence that took place for about 11 years left more than a million people displaced by the hostilities: fleeing to other places around Sudan or across the border to Chad.

The ethnic conflict in Darfur has been persistent, with racism at its roots. Darfur is home to six million people and several dozen tribes. Darfur is split into two: "those who claim Black 'African' descent and primarily practice sedentary agriculture, and those who claim 'Arab' descent and are mostly semi-nomadic livestock herders".

In 2013, the United Nations (UN) estimated that up to 300,000 people had been killed during the genocide; in response, the Sudanese government claimed that the number of deaths was "grossly inflated". By 2015, it was estimated that the death toll stood between 100,000 and 400,000.

The violence continued into 2016 where the government allegedly used chemical weapons against the local population in Darfur. This led to millions being displaced due to the hostile environment. Over 3 million lives are heavily impacted by the conflict.

War crimes 

The BBC first reported on the issue of ethnic cleansing in November 2003, and earlier that year in March. An administrator from the United States Agency for International Development giving testimony to congress mentioned ethnic cleansing and the "population clearance" which was occurring in Darfur.

In April 2004, Human Rights Watch (HRW) released Darfur Destroyed: Ethnic Cleansing by Government and Militia Forces in Western Sudan, a 77-page report compiled by HRW following 25 days spent in the region. The executive director of the African branch of HRW, Peter Takirambudde, stated: "There can be no doubt about the Sudanese government's culpability in crimes against humanity in Darfur".

Rape during the Darfur genocide 

The use of rape as a tool of genocide has been noted. This crime has been carried out by Sudanese government forces and the Janjaweed ("evil men on horseback") paramilitary groups. The actions of the Janjaweed have been described as genocidal rape, with not just women, but children as well. There were also reports of infants being bludgeoned to death, and the sexual mutilation of victims being commonplace.

With the ongoing conflict, it has not been possible for interviewers and activists to conduct population-based surveys in Darfur. However, the rapes reported have mostly occurred in non-Arab villages by the Janjaweed with the assistance of the Sudanese beans.

The settings in which these attacks occurred:
 The Janjaweed forces surrounded the village and then attacked girls and women who left the village to gather firewood or water.
 The Janjaweed forces either went house to house, killing the boys and men while raping the girls and women or rounded up everyone, bringing them to a central location, where the forces then killed the boys and men then raped the girls and women.
 The Janjaweed forces went to nearby villages or towns, internally displaced person (IDP) camps, or across the border into Chad to rape women and children.

According to Tara Gingerich and Jennifer Leaning, the rape attacks were often carried out in front of others "including husbands, fathers, mothers, and children of the victims, who were forced to watch and were prevented from intervening". This genocidal rape has been committed upon a wide age range, that includes women of 70 years or older, girls under 10, and visibly pregnant women.

The missing women and girls have possibly been released but may have heretofore been unable to reunite with their families. In a statement to the UN, former secretary-general Kofi Annan said "In Darfur, we see whole populations displaced, and their homes destroyed, while rape is used as a deliberate strategy."

International intervention

United Nations – African Union Hybrid Operation in Darfur (UNAMID) 
The United Nations issued a hybrid United Nations-African Union mission (UNAMID) to maintain peace in Darfur. It was established on 31 July 2007 with the adoption of Security Council resolution 1769. However, it formally took over on 31 December 2007. The Mission's headquarters is in El Fasher, North Darfur. It has sector headquarters in El Geneina (West Darfur), Nyala (South Darfur), Zalingei (Central Darfur) and El Daein (East Darfur). The Mission has 35 deployment locations throughout the five Darfur states.

The African Union (AU) and the United Nations (UN) produced a framework document for intensive diplomatic and political peacekeeping efforts. Sudan's acceptance of the African Union Hybrid Operation in Darfur derived from intensive negotiations by Secretary-General Ban Ki-moon and several actors in the international community. According to the UNAMID website, "the mandate is renewed yearly, and the adoption of Security Council Resolution 2296 extended it until 30 June 2017."

The peacekeeping mission is confronted with several challenges from security to logistical constraints. The troops that have been deployed operate in unforgiving, complex, and often hostile political environments. Also, the missions are faced with many shortages in equipment, infrastructure, transportation, and aviation assets. As the budget of UNAMID is $1,039,573.2 for the fiscal year 2016–2017.

Yet, with the limited resources and hostile environment, the troops still manage to provide protection to the locals in Darfur and assist the progress of the humanitarian aid operation. UNAMID contributes to promote peace, address the critical roots of the conflict and help end the violence considering "the mission carries out more than 100 patrols daily".

The peacekeepers facilitate cooperation and maintain peace by:
 Protecting civilians without prejudice to the responsibility of the Government of Sudan.
 Delivering humanitarian assistance by UN agencies and other aid actors and the safety and security of humanitarian personnel.
 Intervening between the Government of Sudan and non-signatory movements.
 Resolving community conflict through measures of addressing its root causes.

The mission had an authorized strength of 25,987 uniformed peacekeepers on 31 July 2007. The operation included 19,555 troops, 360 military observers and liaison officers, 3,772 police advisers and 2,660 formed police units (FPU).

In mid-2011, UNAMID stood at 90 percent of its full authorized strength, making it one of the largest UN peacekeeping operations.

2018 
Although violence is still occurring in Darfur, it is at a low level and the region is increasingly stable. The UNAMID forces are exiting as there had been a reduction to the number of troops deployed in the field in Darfur, Sudan.

The Deputy Secretary-General of the United Nations Amina Mohammed states: "We have invested $16 billion in peacekeeping alone over the past ten years, in addition to humanitarian funding and bilateral aid to alleviate the suffering of the population. As the region recovers from war, now is the time to consolidate gains," she said, adding that it was time to "step up and make sure Darfur moves towards peace and prosperity."

Reactions 

In 2007 a former employee of Google, Andria Ruben McCool, conceived the idea of using the high resolution imagery from Google Earth to map what was occurring in Darfur. The project was titled Crisis in Darfur and is run by the United States Holocaust Memorial Museum in partnership with Google Earth. The software allows users to zoom in on the region, and users were able to see over 1600 destroyed and damaged villages. Mark Tarn writing in the Guardian describes the images as "dramatic" as the area is marked by red and yellow icons which he says "graphically conveys the mayhem that has been inflicted on the people of the region."

In 2004, Colin Powell told the state committee on foreign affairs that genocide had been carried out in Darfur, that the Sudanese government and the Janjaweed were responsible, and that the genocide may still be ongoing. Powell stated that having reviewed the evidence which had been compiled by the State Department and having compared it to information that was freely available throughout the international community he came to the conclusion that genocide had been carried out in Darfur.

On September 21, 2004, during the Senate Foreign Relations convention, Powell said:"In July, we launched a limited investigation by sending a team to visit the refugee camps in Chad to talk to refugees and displaced persons. The team ... were able to interview 1136 of the 2.2 million people the UN estimates have been affected by this horrible situation.""Those interviews indicated: ... a consistent and widespread pattern of atrocities: Killings, rapes, burning of villages committed by jingaweit and government forces against non-Arab villagers; three-fourths of those interviewed reported that the Sudanese military forces were involved in the attacks; ... [villages] often experienced multiple attacks over a prolonged period before they were destroyed by burning, shelling or bombing, making it impossible for the villagers to return to their villages. This was a coordinated effort, not just random violence.""When we reviewed the evidence compiled by our team, and then put it beside other information available to the State Department and widely known throughout the international community, widely reported upon by the media and by others, we concluded, I concluded, that genocide has been committed in Darfur and that the Government of Sudan and the Jingaweit bear responsibility-and that genocide may still be occurring."Powell concluded by announcing that at the next UN Security Council Resolution an investigation on all violations of international humanitarian law and human rights will occur in Darfur, Sudan with a view to ensuring accountability.

In a speech delivered on May 29, 2007, U.S. President George W. Bush confirmed that the situation in Darfur was a genocide. Citing Sudanese President Omar al-Bashir's failure to cooperate, he announced tightened economic sanctions on Sudan and that he would pursue a United Nations Security Council resolution to impose additional sanctions, including prohibiting the Sudanese government from conducting military flights over Darfur. He urged the United Nations, the African Union, and other members of the international community to not obstruct the steps being taken to restore peace to Darfur and called upon President Bashir to cooperate with peacekeeping forces and stop the killings of innocent people in Darfur.

According to Rebecca Joyce Frey, the international community has taken the same stance with regards to Darfur as it did with the Rwandan genocide, that of an "outside observer" or "bystander." Joyce Frey also argues that Bashir, as well as other leaders, have realized that the lack of intervention in Rwanda from the international community gives them free rein to continue the genocide without them having any serious concerns over international intervention.

Nicholas Kristof, writing in the New York Times, has claimed China "is financing, diplomatically protecting and supplying the arms for the first genocide of the 21st century" in Darfur.

China was seen as an enabler for President Bashir's resistance to UN deployment and international attention. China did press Sudan to accept the UN deployments in Darfur; however, China had also supplied Khartoum with weapons and had the power to single-handedly veto resolutions of the United Nations Security Council. China's primary goal is not achieving better human rights practices in the abstract but satisfying Darfur's basic needs for food, shelter, and security.

In a 176-page report carried out by the International Commission of Inquiry on Darfur to the United Nations Secretary-General, the Commission determined that the Government of Sudan did not intentionally pursue policies that would lead to genocide. The Commission "found that government forces and militias conducted indiscriminate attacks, including killing of civilians, torture, enforced disappearances, destruction of villages, rape and other forms of sexual violence, pillaging and forced displacement, throughout Darfur." The Commission concluded, however, that "[t]he crucial element of genocidal intent appears to be missing, at least as far as the central government authorities are concerned." The Commission goes on to say that the war crimes and crimes against humanity that occurred in Darfur are just as important as if the situation were determined to be a genocide.

The Save Darfur Coalition, as David Lanz discusses in his article entitled, "Save Darfur: A Movement and Its Discontents", was one of the biggest international social movements and had significant impacts on how the world reacted to Darfur. Some of the achievements that Lanz attributes to the Save Darfur Coalition, that became extremely popular in the United States, was the change in rhetoric from the government. Lanz attributes Colin Powell's consideration of the Darfur Crisis as a genocide as one of the movement's biggest achievements. One other accomplishment that Save Darfur claims responsibility for was their vital role in lobbying the UN Security Council for their referral of Darfur to the ICC.

In the United States, the Save Darfur movement got the attention of many celebrities, most notably including: Angelina Jolie, Brad Pitt, George Clooney, Mia Farrow and Richard Branson. Farrow famously travelled to Darfur and filmed children playing. Farrow and Branson also posted videos to YouTube, where they, and others, went on hunger strikes in solidarity to the people in Darfur. George Clooney was credited as one of the most influential celebrities to bring the Darfur Crisis onto the world stage. Angelina Jolie and Brad Pitt had made $1m donation to three charities working in Sudan.

Proceedings of the ICC 

Initially the ICC refused to add the charge of genocide to the indictment for Bashir; however,  following an appeal this decision was overturned. The trial chamber found that there were "reasonable grounds to believe him responsible for three counts of genocide".

On 14 July 2009, the ICC issued an indictment for the president of Sudan, Omar Bashir, for crimes against humanity and for having facilitated and ordering the genocide in Darfur. On 12 July 2010 the ICC issued a second indictment for the arrest of al-Bashir for genocide, this was the first instance of the ICC issuing an arrest warrant for the crime of genocide. As well as Bashir another six suspects have been indicted by the court, Ahmed Haroun, Ali Kushayb, Bahar Abu Garda, Abdallah Banda, Saleh Jerbo, Abdel Rahim Mohammed Hussein, none of those indicted have yet been taken into custody.

Luis Moreno-Ocampo, prosecutor for the ICC having filed charges for crimes against humanity, is also pursuing in his application the charge of genocidal rape as such actions can be tried before the ICC as stand-alone crimes.

On February 11, 2020, the government of Sudan agreed that former president Omar al-Bashir will face war crime charges before the ICC. The commitment came during peace talks with rebel groups.

Darfur refugee camps 

The citizens in Darfur who have fled the genocide in Sudan—and continue to flee today—settle in one of the 13 refugee camps in Eastern Chad. About 360,000 Darfuri's suffer in those camps: "The 10+ years they have lived in the camps have been marked by tight resources, threats from inside and outside the camps, and more, but life is getting even harder for the refugees."

UNHCR proposed to the UN Secretary-General to "take responsibility for the protection and voluntary return of IDPs to their villages of origin in West Darfur in partnership with other agencies…". The UN approved of their proposal to govern and create a protective environment in camps, host communities and settlements for the displaced people to a within Darfur.

There have been funding shortfalls which impacted the increase in the refugees and internally displaced persons. The environment and lack of exceptional living conditions is not able to accommodate the refugee community.

As of 2018, a group of refugees that have been in Chad since 2003–2004 are returning to North Darfur. They are the first of thousands who are expected to return voluntarily to Darfur in the coming months. The refugees are provided with transport and packages which include three months of food rations, provided by the World Food Programme (WFP). As the peace and security situation is maintained in Darfur, more refugees will want to return to Sudan.

Media and popular culture

Films 
The documentary The Devil Came on Horseback (2007), focuses on the violence and tragedy of the genocide happening in Darfur. The story is seen through the eyes of an American who returns home to make the story public using the images and stories of lives systematically destroyed.

In 2009, Uwe Boll, a director and producer, released a movie named Attack on Darfur. The story centers on American journalists visiting Sudan to interview the locals about the ongoing conflict. They are confronted with the atrocities the Janjaweed caused in which they try their best to stop the killings and help the villagers faced with genocide.

Filmmaker Ted Braun examines the genocide in Darfur, Sudan. Alongside Hotel Rwanda star Don Cheadle, the film Darfur Now (2007) is a call to action for people all over the world to help the ongoing crisis in Darfur.

Sand And Sorrow: A New Documentary about Darfur (2007) is a documentary film about the ongoing Darfur conflict. Interviews and footage of human right activist John Prendergast, Harvard professor Samantha Power and New York Times columnist Nicholas Kristof are shown to depict the origins and the aftermath of the conflict between the Arab and non-Arab tribes in the Darfur region.

See also
 Outline of Genocide studies

References

Bibliography 

Totten, Samuel (2012). An Oral and Documentary History of the Genocide in Darfur. Santa Barbara, CA: Praeger Security International.

Further reading

 

Genocides in Africa
Genocide of indigenous peoples
2000s murders in Africa
2010s murders in Africa
2003 murders in Sudan
2000s murders in Sudan
2010s murders in Sudan
2010 murders iin  Sudan
Human rights abuses in Sudan